Minna Harkavy  (November 13, 1887 – 1987) (birth occasionally listed as 1895) was an American sculptor.

She was born in Estonia to Yoel and Hannah Rothenberg and immigrated to the United States around 1900. She studied at the Art Students League, at Hunter College and in Paris with Antoine Bourdelle.

Harkavy was a WPA  Federal Art Project artist, for whom she created a 1942 wood relief piece, Industry and Landscape of Winchendon for the post office in Winchendon, Massachusetts.

She was a founding member of the Sculptors Guild  and showed a work, My Children are Desolate Because the Enemy Prevailed in the Second Outdoor Sculpture Exhibition Negro Head in the 1940-1941  and Woman in Thought in 1941.

Harkavy was a founding member of the New York Society of Women Artists.  Politically she was known as a leftist and anti-fascist with a strong social consciousness.  In 1931 she exhibited a bust of Hall Johnson in the Museum of Western Art in Moscow and the work was purchased for the Pushkin Museum there.  In 1932 she represented the John Reed Club at an anti-war conference in Amsterdam.

A bust of Italian-American anti-fascist (and her lover) Carlo Tresca who was assassinated in New York in 1943 was installed in his birthplace of Sulmona, Italy.

She was one of 250 sculptors who exhibited in the 3rd Sculpture International held at the Philadelphia Museum of Art in the summer of 1949.

She married Louis Harkavy, a New York pharmacist who also wrote for Yiddish-language periodicals.

Work
Harkavy's works can be found in:
 USPO,  Winchendon, Massachusetts 
 Whitney Museum of American Art 
 Merchandise Mart,  Chicago, Illinois 
 Hermitage Museum in Saint Petersburg, Russia 
Harkavy's New England Woman, was displayed at the New York World's Fair of 1939

References

1887 births
1987 deaths
20th-century American sculptors
20th-century American women artists
American women sculptors
Art Students League of New York alumni
Artists from New York City
Estonian emigrants to the United States
Federal Art Project
Modern sculptors
Federal Art Project artists
Sculptors Guild members
Works Progress Administration workers
Sculptors from New York (state)